The Rangiya–Dibrugarh Express is an Express train belonging to Northeast Frontier Railway zone that runs between  and  in India. It is currently being operated with 15967/15968 train numbers on a six days in a weekly basis.

Service

The 15967/Rangiya–Dibrugarh Express has an average speed of 40 km/hr and covers 604 km in 15h. The 15968/Dibrugarh–Rangiya Express has an average speed of 41 km/hr and covers 604 km in 14h 45m.

Route and halts 

The important halts of the train are:

Coach composition

The train has standard ICF rakes with a max speed of 110 kmph. The train consists of 16 coaches:

 2 Second Sitting
 12 General Unreserved
 2 Seating cum Luggage Rake(SLR)

Traction

Both trains are hauled by a Guwahati Loco Shed-based WDM-2 diesel locomotive from Rangiya to Dibrugarh and vice versa.

See also 

The train shares its rake with 15927/15928 Rangiya–New Tinsukia Express.

Notes

See also 

 Rangiya Junction railway station
 Dibrugarh railway station
 Rangiya–New Tinsukia Express

References

External links 

 15967/Rangiya - Dibrugarh Express
 15968/Dibrugarh - Rangiya Express

Transport in Rangiya
Transport in Dibrugarh
Express trains in India
Rail transport in Assam
Rail transport in Nagaland
Railway services introduced in 2016